Achkhoy-Martan (Jaşxoy-Marta or Тӏехьа-Марта, Theẋa-Marta) is a rural locality (a selo) in, and the administrative center of Achkhoy-Martanovsky District, Chechnya.

Administrative and municipal status 
Municipally, Achkhoy-Martan is incorporated as Achkhoy-Martanovskoye rural settlement. It is the administrative center of the municipality and is the only settlement included in it. Achkhoy-Martan, which is the largest rural settlement in Chechnya, is also the administrative center of Achkhoy-Martanovsky District.

Geography 

The Fortanga River flows through the center of the village. To the east of the village is the Achkhu River. The name of the village comes from these two rivers.

The nearest settlements to Achkhoy-Martan are Novy Sharoy in the north, Shaami-Yurt in the north-east, Katyr-Yurt in the east, Stary Achkhoy and Yandi in the south-east, Bamut in the south-west, and Assinovskaya in the north-west.

History 
In 1944, after the genocide and deportation of the Chechen and Ingush people and the Chechen-Ingush ASSR was abolished, the village of Achkhoy-Martan was renamed to Novoselskoye, and settled by people from other ethnic groups. From 1944 to 1957, it was the administrative center of the Novoselsky District of Grozny Oblast.

In 1957, when the Vaynakh people returned and the Chechen-Ingush ASSR was restored, the village regained its old name, Achkhoy-Martan.

The village came to national attention in Russia in 1999 during the second Chechen War when it saw intense fighting and suffered severe destruction. This event is featured in the popular Russian war song "Ты только маме, что я в Чечне, не говори"

Population 
 1959 Census: 8,389
 1970 Census: 12,250
 1979 Census: 12,276
 1989 Census: 14,680
 1990 Census: 15,101
 2002 Census: 16,742
 2010 Census: 20,172
 2019 estimate: 24,212

According to the results of the 2010 Census, the majority of residents of Achkhoy-Martan (20,113 or 99.7%) were ethnic Chechens, with 59 people (0.3%) coming from other ethnic backgrounds.

Infrastructure 

The district library in Achkhoy-Martan has around 70,000 books. The village also hosts nine secondary schools, an eight-year school, three kindergartens, and a youth center. Prior to the outbreak of hostilities, a boarding school was also present in Achkhoy-Martan. The village also hosts a mosque.

Industry 
The Achkhoy-Martan state farm exists in the village, and engages in cereal crops, cattle breeding and gardening. The village also hosts the largest seed processing plant in Chechnya, as well as a plastic factory, one of the largest bases of building materials in the republic.

Sport 
The village has its own football club "Marta", volleyball team "Achkhoy", a sports club, and hosts competitions in judo, karate, taekwondo and boxing.

Famous people 
 Tamerlan Bashaev, judoka;
 Yunus Desheriev, scholar and linguist;
 Magomet Mamakaev, Chechen poet, prose writer, publicist, and literary critic;
 Magomed Bibulatov, famous MMA fighter.
 Rassambek Akhmatov, professional footballer
 Ziya Bazhayev, businessman

References 

Rural localities in Achkhoy-Martanovsky District